Pray for Villains is the fourth studio album by American heavy metal band DevilDriver, released on July 14, 2009. It sold around 14,600 copies in its first week of release to debut at position No. 35 on the Billboard 200 chart.

On April 24, Roadrunner unveiled the cover artwork for both the regular and special editions of the album. It was also announced that the special edition would be a CD/DVD package with four bonus tracks, a behind-the-scenes DVD, and expanded artwork. On May 21, DevilDriver released the single "Pray for Villains" to the public. On June 17, the music video for "Pray for Villains" premiered on MetalSucks.net. Play.com also teamed up with Roadrunner to offer "Resurrection Blvd." for free download to people who preorder the special edition of the CD from the Play.com website.

Notes 
 "Self-Affliction" and "Dust Be the Destiny" were recorded during the album's sessions.
 "Damning the Heavens" is a bonus track from The Last Kind Words that was available on the US Hot Topic Only Edition of that album.
 "Wasted Years" is an Iron Maiden cover that originally appeared on the Kerrang! compilation Maiden Heaven: A Tribute to Iron Maiden.
 "Waiting for November" is a song about Fafara's mother-in-law's funeral.
 "Forgiveness Is a Six Gun" is believed to be about The Dark Tower series by author Stephen King.

Track list

Personnel 
DevilDriver
 Dez Fafara – vocals
 Mike Spreitzer – lead guitar
 Jeff Kendrick – rhythm guitar
 Jon Miller – bass, additional guitars
 John Boecklin – drums, additional guitars

Charts

References

External links 
 
 Pray for Villains at DevilDriver's official website
 Pray for Villains at Roadrunner Records
 Pray for Villains (Special Edition) at DevilDriver's official website
 Pray for Villains (Special Edition) at Roadrunner Records

DevilDriver albums
2009 albums
Roadrunner Records albums
Albums produced by Logan Mader